This article provides details of international football games played by the El Salvador national football team from 1921 to 1949.

1920s

1930s

1940s

Head-to-head record

References 

El Salvador national football team